The women's tournament of the 2016 M&M Meat Shops Canadian Junior Curling Championships were held from January 23 to 31 at the Stratford Rotary Complex.

Teams
The teams are listed as follows:

Round-robin standings
Final round-robin standings

Round-robin results
All draw times are listed in Eastern Standard Time (UTC−5:00).

Pool A

Draw 1
Saturday, January 23, 13:30

Draw 2
Saturday, January 24, 18:30

Draw 3
Sunday, January 24, 13:30

Draw 4
Sunday, January 24, 18:30

Draw 5
Monday, January 25, 9:00

Draw 6
Monday, January 25, 13:30

Draw 7
Monday, January 25, 18:30

Draw 8
Tuesday, January 26, 13:30

Draw 9
Tuesday, January 26, 18:30

Pool B

Draw 1
Saturday, January 23, 13:30

Draw 2
Saturday, January 23, 18:30

Draw 3
Sunday, January 24, 13:30

Draw 4
Sunday, January 24, 18:30

Draw 5
Monday, January 25, 9:00

Draw 6
Monday, January 25, 13:30

Draw 7
Monday, January 25, 18:30

Draw 8
Tuesday, January 26, 13:30

Draw 9
Tuesday, January 26, 18:30

Placement Round

Seeding Pool

Standings
Final round-robin standings

Draw 1
Wednesday, January 27, 13:30

Draw 2
Wednesday, January 27, 18:30

Draw 3
Thursday, January 28, 13:30

Draw 4
Thursday, January 28, 18:30

Draw 5
Friday, January 29, 9:00

Championship Pool

Championship Pool Standings
Final round-robin standings

Draw 1
Wednesday, January 27, 13:30

Draw 2
Wednesday, January 27, 18:30

Draw 3
Thursday, January 28, 13:30

Draw 4
Thursday, January 28, 18:30

Draw 5
Friday, January 29, 9:00

Tiebreaker
Friday, January 29, 14:00

Playoffs

Semifinal
Saturday, January 30, 14:00

Final
Sunday, January 31, 10:00

References

External links

Junior Championships
Canadian Junior Curling Championships, 2016
Sport in Stratford, Ontario
Canadian Junior Curling Championships
Canadian Junior Curling